Wicked is a real-time strategy horror-themed video game released for the Amiga, Atari ST, and Commodore 64 in 1989 by Binary Vision and Electric Dreams Software. Activision had intended to release the game for MS-DOS with EGA graphics in 1989, but the port was cancelled.

Plot
The protagonist of the game is sacrificed in order to become a ring of fire to combat the evil forces of darkness that mean to plunge the earth in eternal darkness. The evil forces exist in three different points of each Zodiacal constellation.

Gameplay
The game consists of using the ring of fire to keep the evil spores at bay, preventing new evil portals existing, defeating guardians so that the good spores can spread and destroy the existing evil portals before the time runs out. The difficulty of the game is determined by the night and day cycle, which has longer nights in the later levels.

Reception

References

External links
Wicked at Atari Mania
Wicked at Lemon Amiga
Wicked at Gamebase 64
Commodore 64 manual

1989 video games
Amiga games
Atari ST games
Commodore 64 games
Cancelled DOS games
1980s horror video games
Real-time strategy video games
Video games scored by Richard Joseph
Video games developed in the United Kingdom